Popcorn Monkey Tiger is a 2020 Indian Kannada-language crime film directed by Duniya Soori and produced by K.M. Sudhir. It features Dhananjay in the lead role, along with Nivedhitha. 
The soundtrack and score are composed by Charan Raj, cinematography is by Shekhar S. and the art department was handled by Malla. The script was written by Amritha K. Bhargav and Duniya Soori, screenplay was written by Amritha K. Bhargav. The film serves sequel to the Kendasampige (2016) and to Kaage Bangara (2020).

Plot
The plot unfolds in a reverse chronological fashion. The plot's focus is the life of protagonist Seena and the evolution of his character due to external forces that sway him in several directions. Women/lovers involved in Seena's life contribute to these forces that trigger the Metamorphosis of his character. He goes from being a garage mechanic to being a prominent leader in the underworld mafia.  

"Popcorn" Devi, one of the lovers, has a profound impact on Seena's life. The back story on how "Popcorn" Devi got involved with the underworld unfolds parallelly alongside Seena's story.

Cast
 Dhananjay as Tiger Seena aka "Monkey" Seena
 Nivedhitha as Devika aka "Popcorn" Devi
 Sparsha Rekha as Padma
 Amrutha Iyengar as Sumithra
Sapthami Gowda as Girija
Prabhu Srinivas as Razor Gopi
Sinchana Gowda as Sinchu
 Monisha Nadgir as Sujaata
 Poornachandra Mysore as Bablu
 Prashanth Siddi as Havrani
 Goutam as Rakesh aka "Mooga"
 Nanda Kishore as Khalai
 Sudhi as Kothmeri
 Niranjan as Bhadravathi Kushka
 Nikhil as Michel

Soundtrack

Charan Raj scored the background music and soundtrack for the film. The soundtrack album comprises two tracks, the lyrics for which were written by Rithwik Kaikini and HanuManKind. The audio rights were bought by PRK Audio in December 2019.

Kaikini wrote the track "Maadeva" which featured lyrics in English. The song was initially titled "Wah Wah Wah" and was later changed to "Maadeva" by Raj by saying "The decision of using English vocals on this number was rather organic. For Maadeva, we worked according to the visuals, and when Suri reviewed, he said this met his expectations." Director Suri said, "So far, I would have helped create over 50 songs for the movies. At one stage, the interest wore off and I did not want any songs for this film. I needed a mood for a particular scene and asked composer Charan Raj. He and lyricists Ritwik Kaikini and HanuManKind came up with this. Once I delegate, I hand it over completely. I don't get much English, and my associate Amritha Bhargav explained the lyrics to me. The song made a lot of sense, and I went ahead with it."

Reception
The film opened with positive reviews from critics. Sunayna Suresh of Times of India gave 3.5 stars on 5 and said that "A Film for lovers of gore and the underworld". Aravind Shwetha of The News Minute gave it 3 stars on 5 and praised the reverse chronological screenplay of the film.

References

External links 

Indian crime films
2020s Kannada-language films
Indian gangster films
Films directed by Duniya Soori
2020 crime films